Kikuyuni is a settlement in Kenya's Coast Province. It was named after immigrant Kikuyu who converted to Islam in the early twentieth century and intermarried with Swahili residents near Malindi.

References 

Malindi Commission of Inquiry, Report, 22 December 1916, British National Archives CO 533 180

Populated places in Coast Province